The coat of arms or state emblem of Pakistan was adopted in 1954 and symbolizes Pakistan's ideological foundation, the basis of its economy, its cultural heritage and its guiding principles.

Design
The four components of the emblem are a crescent and star crest above an escutcheon, which is surrounded by a wreath, below which is a scroll. The crest and the green colour of the emblem are considered traditional symbols of Islam. The quartered shield in the centre shows cotton, wheat, tea and jute, which were the major crops of Pakistan at independence and are shown in a form of escutcheon and signify as the main agricultural base for the importance of the Nation's economy. The floral wreath, surrounding the shield, is Jasminum officinale (the national flower) and represents the floral designs used in traditional Mughal art and emphasizes the cultural heritage of Pakistan. The scroll supporting the shield contains the national motto in Urdu, "", which reads from right to left:, translated as "Faith, Unity, Discipline" which are intended as the guiding principles for Pakistan. This logo was designed by Maraj Muhammad student of National College of Arts

Other emblems in Pakistan

Former state emblem (1947-1954)

Emblems of national bodies

Regional emblems

Former regional emblems

See also

 Flag of Pakistan
 National Anthem of Pakistan

References

Government of Pakistan
Pakistan
Emblem
Pakistan
Pakistan
Pakistan
Pakistan
Pakistan